David Graham Sewell (born 20 October 1977) is a former New Zealand cricketer. He played one Test match for New Zealand against Zimbabwe in 1997. 

Sewell was born in Christchurch. He was a right-handed batsman and a left-arm fast-medium bowler. He played first-class cricket for Otago and played for North Otago in the Hawke Cup. His best bowling figures were 8 for 31 for Otago against Central Districts in 1996–97. He toured Zimbabwe with the Test team in 1997-98.

See also
 One-Test wonder

References

External links
 

1977 births
Living people
New Zealand cricketers
New Zealand Test cricketers
Otago cricketers
South Island cricketers